Callenya melaena, the metallic hedge blue, is a small butterfly found in India that belongs to the lycaenids or blues family.

Description
Male upperside: deep brown. Forewing: with the basal half dark blue, dull in certain lights, rich, shining and iridescent in others; this colour does not reach the costa, apex or termen where the ground colour forms a broad border to the blue. Hindwing: uniform brown; in certain lights iridescent blue over the basal third, but the blue does not reach either the costa or the dorsum. Underside; dull greyish white. Forewing: with the following fuscous-brown markings: a short transverse line on the discocellulars; a postdiscal transverse series of elongate spots or extremely short bars, the posterior three placed slightly en echelon, the one nearest the costa shifted well inwards; beyond this a transverse unbroken line, a subterminal series of small spots and an anteciliary dark line; costal margin somewhat broadly shaded with very pale brownish grey. Hindwing: a minute spot on dorsum near base of wing, a series of three subbasal spots placed obliquely across the wing and beyond them a much larger round subcostal spot in interspace 7, black; a short dusky brown line on the discocellulars, a brown spot above it in base of interspace 6; a transverse posterior discal series of five spots also brown, the upper four in a slight curve, the lowest shifted outwards out of line with the others; lastly, terminal transverse markings much as on the forewing, only the fuscous brown hue on the inner side of the subterminal series of spots replaced by a series of connected slender lunules. Cilia of forewings and hindwings grey. Antenna, head, thorax and abdomen dark brown, the antennae ringed with white; beneath: palpi, thorax and abdomen greyish white.

Taxonomy
The butterfly was earlier known as Lycaenopsis melaena and was placed in the genus Celastrina.

Range
It is found from Assam to Manipur in India and in Sumatra, Malaya, Indochina, Burma, Thailand and Laos.

Subspecies
Callenya melaena melaena (Manipur, Burma, northern Thailand, Laos)
Callenya melaena shonen (Taiwan)

Cited references

References
 
 

Polyommatini
Fauna of Pakistan
Butterflies of Asia
Butterflies of Indochina